Tormod Bjørnetun Haugen (born 28 October 1988) is a Norwegian speed skater and inline skater representing Sandefjord SK. Haugen has participated in World Championships in inline skating, and has been selected to make his debut at the 2012–13 ice speed skating World Cup series starting in Heerenveen on 16 November. Haugen won his first national medals at the 2012 Norwegian Single Distance Championships in Bjugn, taking bronze medals on 5000m and 10,000m.  His cousins August Teodor Haugen and Sofie Karoline Haugen are also active speed skaters for Sandefjord SK.

References

1988 births
People from Sandefjord
Norwegian male speed skaters
Inline speed skaters
Living people
Sportspeople from Vestfold og Telemark